Line TV Awards (styled as LINE TV Awards), is an annual entertainment awards presented by LINE TV Thailand. Held within the service's annual NEXPLOSION event, the awards honor people in the Thai entertainment industry and their achievements in the fields of music, television and drama. Nominees are fan-voted through the LINE app and website.

The first ceremony was held on 20 February 2018 at the Royal Paragon Hall of Siam Paragon. In 2021, the awards ceremony was held virtually for the first time with no in-person venue due to the COVID-19 pandemic.

Ceremonies

Award categories
As of 2021, there are 12 categories split between the fan-voted or major awards and special awards which are based on app and website statistics:

Major awards 
 Best Dramatic Scene
 Best Comedy Scene
 Best Viral Scene
 Best Kiss Scene
 Best Couple
 Best Rising Star
 Best Song

Special awards
 Series of the Year (awarded as Content of the Year from 2018 to 2019)
 Animation of the Year
 Top Searched Content of the Year
 Most Hearted Content of the Year
 Most Followers of the Year

Past award categories
 Best Fight Scene (2018–2019)
 Most Viewed Content of the Year (2018–2019)
 Top Entertainment/Entertainment Program of the Year (2018–2020)
 Best Friends (2019)
 Talk of the Town Award (2019)
 Best MC (2019–2020)

References

External links 
 

Thai television awards
Awards established in 2018
2018 establishments in Thailand